José Miguel Guzman (born 19 May 1956) is a Dominican Republic weightlifter. He competed in the men's super heavyweight event at the 1988 Summer Olympics.

References

External links
 

1956 births
Living people
Dominican Republic male weightlifters
Olympic weightlifters of the Dominican Republic
Weightlifters at the 1988 Summer Olympics
Place of birth missing (living people)
Pan American Games medalists in weightlifting
Pan American Games silver medalists for the Dominican Republic
Weightlifters at the 1983 Pan American Games
20th-century Dominican Republic people
21st-century Dominican Republic people